Adrian Charles David Moylan (born 26 June 1955) is an English former first-class cricketer.

Moylan was born at Weston-super-Mare in June 1955. He was educated at Clifton College, before going up to Downing College, Cambridge. While studying at Cambridge, he played first-class cricket infrequently for Cambridge University Cricket Club in 1976 and 1977, making five appearances. Playing as an opening batsman, he scored 176 runs in his five matches at an average of 19.55, with a highest score of 29. He additionally played for the Somerset second eleven from 1973 to 1977, but was unable to establish himself in the Somerset first eleven.

References

External links

1955 births
Living people
People from Weston-super-Mare
People educated at Clifton College
Alumni of Downing College, Cambridge
English cricketers
Cambridge University cricketers